Nigroporus macroporus is a species of poroid fungus in the family Steccherinaceae. It was described as new to science in 2003 by mycologists Leif Ryvarden and Teresa Iturriaga. Found in Venezuela and Brazil, it is a wood-decay fungus that causes a white rot in the hardwood Dimorphandra macrostachya.

Description
They have a leathery texture when fresh that becomes dry and woody in age. The dark brown pore surface comprises pores numbering 1–2 per millimetre, or fewer on decurrent parts where the pores get stretched out. The spores of N. macroporus are cylindrical, smooth and thin-walled, hyaline, and measure 5–6 by 1.7–2 µm.

The neotropical species Nigroporus rigidus is quite similar in appearance to N. macroporus, but the former species has much smaller pores, numbering 7–9 per millimetre.

References

Fungi described in 2003
Fungi of South America
Steccherinaceae
Taxa named by Leif Ryvarden